Cabramatta Two Blues, colloquially known as Cabra, is an Australian rugby league football club that was originally formed in 1919 and then later completely formed as the Two Blues in 1939. They have always based from the Parramatta Junior Leagues, and their junior teams compete in the Parramatta District Junior Rugby League Association. They compete in the Ron Massey Cup and Sydney Shield however both sides did not field a side for the 2022 season in either competition. They play out of the Cabramatta, New South Wales, Sports Ground Complex which can fit up to 5,000 spectators. The Two Blues have won numerous A-Grade Titles with their last Premiership received in 2002.

Ron Massey Cup
In 2011, Cabramatta won their first Ron Massey Cup in the final against Mount Pritchard Mounties.
In 2013, Cabramatta finished as minor premiers but failed to win the premiership that year.  In 2018, Cabramatta finished 3rd on the table at the end of the 2018 Ron Massey Cup season.  The Two Blues advanced to the preliminary final before being defeated 34-20 by St Mary's.

Playing Record
Sources: Rugby League Week, Big League, NSWRL Rugby League News, Sydney Morning Herald, Daily Telegraph (Sydney). 
The win–loss–draw record in the table below does not include Finals Series matches.

Sydney Shield
At the end of the regular season in the 2019 Sydney Shield competition, Cabramatta finished as minor premiers only losing 3 games in the process.
Cabramatta then reached the 2019 Sydney Shield grand final after defeating defending premiers East Campbelltown Eagles 42–16 at Kogarah Oval.

In the 2019 Sydney Shield grand final against Ryde-Eastwood, Cabramatta were defeated 22–12 at Leichhardt Oval.

Notable Juniors
Notable First Grade Players that have played at Cabramatta Two Blues include:
Geoff Gerard (1974-89 Parramatta Eels, Manly & Penrith Panthers)
David Riolo (1990-98 Parramatta Eels & Illawarra Steelers)
Shane O'Grady (1991-93 Newcastle Knights, Penrith & Balmain)
Peter Clarke (1993-99 Manly, Sydney Roosters, Adelaide Rams & South Sydney)
Pat Richards (2000-15 Parramatta Eels, Wests & Wigan)
Justin Tsoulos (2003-08 Parramatta Eels & Canterbury-Bankstown Bulldogs)
Jarryd Hayne (2006-18 Parramatta Eels & Gold Coast Titans)
Krisnan Inu (2007-21 Parramatta Eels, New Zealand Warriors, Canterbury-Bankstown Bulldogs, Catalans Dragons, Widnes Vikings, Salford Red Devils & Leigh)
Blake Green (2007-21 Parramatta Eels, Cronulla, Canterbury, Hull Kingston Rovers Wigan Warriors, Manly, Melbourne Storm, New Zealand Warriors)
Tony Williams (2008-18 Parramatta Eels,  Manly, Canterbury & Cronulla-Sutherland Sharks)
Kris Keating (2008-14 Parramatta Eels, Hull Kingston Rovers & Canterbury-Bankstown Bulldogs)
Grant Millington (2008- Cronulla, Canterbury & Castleford Tigers)
Brendan Oake (2008-10 Parramatta Eels)
Matt Keating (2008-13 Parramatta Eels)
Nathan Gardner (2010-14 Cronulla-Sutherland Sharks)
Trent Hodkinson (2010-19 Manly , Newcastle Knights & Canterbury-Bankstown Bulldogs)
Jacob Loko (2011-18 Parramatta Eels, Canterbury-Bankstown Bulldogs)
Francis Vaiotu (2011 Sydney Roosters)
Nathan Brown (2013- Parramatta Eels, Wests Tigers & South Sydney)
Kelepi Tanginoa (2013-21 Parramatta Eels, North Queensland Cowboys, Manly-Warringah Sea Eagles & Wakefield Trinity)
Kaysa Pritchard (2013-18  Parramatta Eels)
Junior Paulo (2014- Parramatta Eels & Canberra Raiders)
Jacob Gagan (2014-19 Cronulla-Sutherland Sharks, Newcastle Knights, South Sydney)
Danny Fualalo (2015-19 Canterbury-Bankstown Bulldogs)
Troy Dargan (2020- South Sydney Rabbitohs)
Stefano Utoikamanu (2020- Parramatta Eels)
Matt Doorey (2020- Canterbury-Bankstown Bulldogs)
Bradley Deitz  (2021- Canterbury-Bankstown Bulldogs)
Trey Mooney  (2022- Canberra Raiders)

Honours
Ron Massey Cup Premiers:
 2011
Ron Massey Cup Minor Premiers:
 2013
Sydney Shield Minor Premiers:
 2019

See also

List of rugby league clubs in Australia
Rugby league in New South Wales

Sources

References

External links

Rugby league teams in Sydney
Rugby clubs established in 1919
1919 establishments in Australia
Ron Massey Cup
Cabramatta, New South Wales